Toyz may refer to:
 ToyZ, a 2009 album by Cinema Bizarre
 Toyz (gamer), a retired professional League of Legends player
 toyz, an element of pet toys for virtual pets in the video games Petz and Oddballz

See also 
 Toy (disambiguation)